

Notes

References

Related lists 
 List of psychiatrists
 List of psychologists
 List of psychiatric drugs
 by condition treated

 
Fictional Psychi
Psychiatrists